Benzenetricarboxylic acid is a group of chemical compounds which are tricarboxylic derivatives of benzene. Benzenetricarboxylic acid comes in three isomers:

All isomers share the molecular weight 210.14 g/mol and the chemical formula C9H6O6.

Benzoic acids
Tricarboxylic acids